Chester is a small rural city in Chester County, South Carolina, United States. The population was 5,607 at the 2010 census, down from 6,476 at the 2000 census. It is the county seat of Chester County.

History
While being transported to Richmond, Virginia, for his trial for treason, former Vice-President Aaron Burr passed through Chester. Burr "flung himself from his horse and cried for a rescue, but the officer commanding the escort seized him, threw him back like a child into the saddle, and marched on."<ref name ="Ad">, History of the United States of America during the Administrations of Thomas Jefferson, Library of America, 1986, p. 828.</ref> The large stone he stood on has been inscribed and is preserved in the town center, and is known locally as the Aaron Burr Rock.

Chester was home to Brainerd Institute, a school for African American children.

The Catholic Presbyterian Church, Chester City Hall and Opera House, Chester Historic District, Colvin-Fant-Durham Farm Complex, Fishdam Ford, Kumler Hall, Lewis Inn, and McCollum Mound are listed on the National Register of Historic Places.

Geography and climate
Chester is located just west of the center of Chester County at  (34.705553, -81.211638). U.S. Route 321 bypasses the city to the west and the south, leading north  to York and south  to Winnsboro. South Carolina Highway 9 passes through the city center and leads east  to Interstate 77 near Richburg and west  to Spartanburg. Highways 72 and 121 lead northeast  to Rock Hill and southwest  to Whitmire.

Demographics

2020 census

As of the 2020 United States census, there were 5,269 people, 2,244 households, and 1,131 families residing in the city.

2000 census
As of the census of 2000, there were 6,476 people, 2,465 households, and 1,639 families residing in the city. The population density was 2,042.8 people per square mile (788.8/km2). There were 2,774 housing units at an average density of 875.0 per square mile (337.9/km2). The racial makeup of the city was 62.26% African American, 36.37% White, 0.15% Native American, 0.28% Asian, 0.03% Pacific Islander, 0.25% from other races, and 0.66% from two or more races. Hispanic or Latino of any race were 0.83% of the population.

There were 2,465 households, out of which 31.8% had children under the age of 18 living with them, 35.4% were married couples living together, 26.4% had a female householder with no husband present, and 33.5% were non-families. 29.5% of all households were made up of individuals, and 11.4% had someone living alone who was 65 years of age or older. The average household size was 2.60 and the average family size was 3.24.

In the city, the population was spread out, with 29.3% under the age of 18, 9.3% from 18 to 24, 26.9% from 25 to 44, 22.5% from 45 to 64, and 12.1% who were 65 years of age or older. The median age was 34 years. For every 100 females, there were 88.1 males. For every 100 females age 18 and over, there were 80.1 males.

The median income for a household in the city was $27,518, and the median income for a family was $32,973. Males had a median income of $27,321 versus $20,802 for females. The per capita income for the city was $13,386. About 16.4% of families and 19.4% of the population were below the poverty line, including 28.3% of those under age 18 and 13.6% of those age 65 or over.

Chester is the center of an urban cluster with a total population of 11,140 (2000 census).

Education
Chester has a public library, a branch of the Chester County Library System.

Police
The Chester Police Department is headed by Chief Eric Williams. It has a staff of twenty-seven police officers.

The department includes gang, narcotics and road patrol units.

Although a small town, Chester suffers higher crime rates than the national average in all categories.

In the media
Chiefs, a miniseries based on the novel by Stuart Woods, was filmed in Chester over the course of three months in 1983. It was nominated for three prime-time Emmy awards, and featured a star-studded cast including Charlton Heston, Keith Carradine, Paul Sorvino, Billy Dee Williams and Danny Glover.

 Notable people  
 Debbie Allen (born 1950), actress, dancer, choreographer, television director and producer
 Sheldon Brown (born 1979), National Football League cornerback
 Marion Campbell (1929–2016), football player: University of Georgia, National Football League, Coach, Atlanta Falcons (born in Chester)
 Devan Downey (born 1987), basketball player (born in Chester)  John Dunovant (1825-1864), Confederate Brigadier General
 Allison Feaster (born 1976), basketball player in the WNBA, French citizen since 2004 (born in Chester)
 Carroll Glenn (1918–1983), concert violinist
 Robert W. Hemphill (1915-1983), Pilot in Army Air Corps (1941-1945), U.S. Congressman (1957-1964), Federal District Court Judge (1964-1983) (born in Chester)
 J. Charles Jones (1937–2019), civil rights activist (born in Chester)
 Donnie McClurkin (born 1959), pastor and gospel singer
 Maurice Morris (born 1979), National Football League running back (born in Chester)
 Ron Rash (born 1953), author of short stories, Western Carolina University (born in Chester)
 Phylicia Rashad (born 1948), actress (The Cosby Show'')
 Britt Robertson (born 1990), film actress (Tomorrowland)
 Elizabeth Talford Scott (1916–2011), artist (born in Chester)

References

External links

 

Cities in South Carolina
Cities in Chester County, South Carolina
County seats in South Carolina
CHESTER OWN"S FAIRFIELD